Eta Boeriu (born Margarita Caranica; February 23, 1923 in Turda – November 13, 1984 in Cluj-Napoca) was a Romanian poet, literary critic and translator. Involved in the Sibiu Literary Circle (which disbanded in 1945), she was especially known for her work as a translator of Italian-language Renaissance literature.

Selected works

Poetry
Ce vânăt crâng, 1971 
Dezordine de umbre, 1973 
Risipă de iubire, 1976 
Miere de întuneric, 1980 
La capătul meu de înserare, published posthumously, 1985

Translation
Giovanni Boccaccio, The Decameron (as Decameronul)
Dante Alighieri, Divine Comedy (as Divina comedie)
Baldassare Castiglione, The Book of the Courtier (as Curteanul)
Francesco Petrarca, Il Canzoniere (as Canţonierul)

References

External links
Laszlo Alexandru, Dante tradotto da Eta Boeriu, in E-Leonardo, Nr.10

Romanian women poets
Romanian literary critics
Romanian women literary critics
Romanian translators
People from Turda
1923 births
1984 deaths
20th-century translators
20th-century Romanian poets
20th-century Romanian women writers